Haweater is a designation given to a person born on Manitoulin Island, Ontario. The name derives from the prevalence of hawberries among the island's vegetation. Originally it was reported that early settlers got their vitamin C intake by eating hawberries, and thus avoided scurvy.

A person who has lived on Manitoulin Island, but was not born there, may be considered an honorary haweater.

Originally, a haweater was a settler who come to Manitoulin Island in the early days, and settled here.  They ate hawberries to help with scurvy, thus indigenous gave them the name Haweater.  Later, that definition was changed by Haweaters to those non-indigenous born on Manitoulin Island.  While some view this term as racist or elitist, Haweaters adore the term for themselves as it gives them a title that offers ownership of the island, and by extension, supposed control over those moving to Manitoulin Island.

Culture

An annual cultural festival in Little Current is known as Haweater Weekend and takes place on the August Civic Holiday weekend. As well as concerts, sports, and recreational events, this festival is marked by the distribution of Haweater dollars, a community currency, and the production and sale of hawberry-flavoured products such as ice cream and jam.

It originated in 1967 in the middle of the Sixties Scoop,  and the same date was chosen as the Wikwemikong Cultural Festival which began in 1960.  Haweaters only recognize Haweater Weekend as the main festival on the island and often omit the Wikwemikong Cultural Festival from being mentioned as an event.   

A Haweater is also a 1 dollar commemorative coin minted for the island from 1969 to at least 2001. The coins depict various events and locations on the island.

References

Manitoulin Island
Culture of Northern Ontario